Gloria Rodríguez Sánchez (born 6 March 1992) is a Spanish road and track cyclist, who currently rides for UCI Women's WorldTeam . She represented her nation at the 2015 UCI Track Cycling World Championships.

Major results

2012
 2nd Meruelo
 8th Time trial, National Road Championships
2013
 7th Time trial, National Road Championships
2014
 National Road Championships
4th Time trial
8th Road race
 4th Bembibre
 4th Balmaseda
 8th Trofeu Fira d'Agost Xativa
2015
 1st Overall Gipuzkoako Emakumeen Itzulia
1st Stage 1 (ITT)
 2nd Overall Vuelta a Burgos Feminas
 2nd Trofeo Roldan
 3rd Larrabasterra
 4th Matiena-Abadiño
 4th Elorrio Time Trial
 6th Trofeo Ria de Marin
 6th Balmaseda
 7th Road race, National Road Championships
 8th Iurreta
 8th Zalla
 9th Trofeo Zamora
2016
 1st Trofeo Roldan
 National Road Championships
2nd Time trial
4th Road race
2017
 1st Time trial, Murcian Road Championships
 1st Larrabasterra
 3rd Overall Volta a Valencia
 National Road Championships
4th Time trial
9th Road race
 4th Berriatua
 10th Bergara Time Trial
2018
 1st Vuelta a Murcia
 1st Trofeo Roldan
 National Road Championships
2nd Road race 
4th Time trial
2019
 3rd Time trial, National Road Championships
2020
 8th Time trial, National Road Championships
2022
 8th Time trial, National Road Championships

References

External links
 

1992 births
Spanish female cyclists
Living people
Cyclists from the Region of Murcia
Spanish track cyclists
21st-century Spanish women